Kenneth William Dougall (born 7 May 1993) is an Australian professional soccer player who plays as a defensive midfielder for Blackpool and the Australia national team. He has previously played for Brisbane City, Telstar, Sparta Rotterdam and Barnsley.

Dougall scored both goals for Blackpool in their 2–1 win in the 2021 EFL League One play-off Final, securing the club's promotion to the Championship for the first time in six years. He made his debut for the Australian national the following month.

Club career

Early years
Dougall played as a junior at Samford Rangers in 2003, as well as attending the Queensland Academy of Sport as a 15-year-old. He joined the Brisbane Roar youth team in 2009, when he was 16.
  
In 2010, he shared the Roar's Youth Player of the Year award with goalkeeper Matt Acton.
Unable to break into the Brisbane Roar team, he says because he "was not yet good enough," he dropped down to National Premier Leagues Queensland, where he started his senior career playing for Brisbane City. During his eighteen months at the club, he was awarded the league's Young Player of the Year award in 2013.

Telstar
In July 2014, Dougall signed for Telstar in the Eerste Divisie and made his debut on 3 October 2014 against Sparta Rotterdam, coming on as an 84th-minute substitute in a 4–3 win. Dougall scored his first goal for the club against Den Bosch on 12 December 2014. On 6 May 2015, it was announced that Dougall would leave Telstar after just one season at the club following a breakdown in contract discussions.

Sparta Rotterdam
On 29 May 2015, Dougall signed a two-year contract with Eerste Divisie side Sparta Rotterdam. Dougall quickly established himself at the club starting in the first fixture of the season away to RKC Waalwijk in a 1–1 draw. He then penned a contract extension after just 6 months keeping him at the club until the summer of 2019.

Barnsley
On 27 July 2018, Dougall joined newly relegated League One side Barnsley on an initial two-year deal with an option for a further year for an undisclosed fee. On 15 March 2019 Dougall suffered a broken leg in a match, initially attempting to play on. 

Dougall was released by Barnsley on 25 June 2020.

Blackpool
Dougall joined Blackpool in October 2020, signing a two-year contract.

On 21 May 2021, Dougall scored his second goal of the season in a 3–3 draw with Oxford United in the second leg of their play-off semi-final. The result saw Blackpool win 6–3 on aggregate and progress to the final, where they met Lincoln City at Wembley Stadium on 30 May. In the final, Dougall scored both goals for Blackpool in their 2–1 win, securing promotion to the Championship for the first time in six years. The club's owner, Simon Sadler, named his pug "Kenny" in acknowledgment of Dougall's role in their promotion.

On 7 October 2021, Dougall signed a new two-year contract with the club.

International career
Dougall earned four caps for the Australian U23 side in 2015.

On 25 May 2021, he was called up for the Australian national team for their remaining 2022 FIFA World Cup qualification matches in June. He made his debut on 3 June 2021 against Kuwait, a 3–0 victory, and made his first start four days later in a 5–1 victory over Chinese Taipei.

He was a substitute in Australia's goalless home draw with Saudi Arabia on 11 November 2021.

Career statistics

Club

International

Honours
Sparta Rotterdam
Eerste Divisie: 2015–16

Barnsley
EFL League One runner-up: 2018–19

Blackpool
EFL League One play-offs: 2021

Personal life
Born in  Brisbane, Queensland, Dougall is of Scottish (paternal side) and Thai descent (maternal side).

Dougall lives in Manchester with his partner Hannah Adkins.

References

External links
 Fox Sports Pulse profile
Kenny Dougall – Soccerbase
 
 

Living people
1993 births
Soccer players from Brisbane
Brisbane City FC players
SC Telstar players
Sparta Rotterdam players
Eerste Divisie players
Eredivisie players
National Premier Leagues players
Australian expatriate soccer players
Australian expatriate sportspeople in the Netherlands
Expatriate footballers in the Netherlands
Australian people of Scottish descent
Australian people of Thai descent
Association football midfielders
Association football central defenders
Barnsley F.C. players
Blackpool F.C. players
Australian expatriate sportspeople in England
Expatriate footballers in England
Australian soccer players
Australia international soccer players